William, Will or Bill Pryor may refer to:

William H. Pryor Jr. (born 1962), American politician, lawyer, and judge on the U.S. Court of Appeals for the Eleventh Circuit
William C. Pryor (1932–2020), Senior Judge, District of Columbia Court of Appeals
Will Pryor, American Dreams character
Bill Pryor (baseball), American baseball player

See also
William Prior (disambiguation)